A Trip to Jamaica is a 2016 Nigerian comedy drama film directed by Robert Peters starring Ayo Makun, Funke Akindele, Nse Ikpe Etim and Dan Davies. The film tells a story about the adventures of a newly engaged couple in their relatives residence outside Nigeria, and how the secrets of their host led to the eventual breakup of their union amidst the culture shock of the new country and living with upper-class citizens. Though a huge box office success, breaking the record set by 30 Days in Atlanta for the highest-grossing Nigerian film, it received mainly mixed to negative reviews from critics.

The movie had its worldwide premiere on 25 September 2016 in Lagos State. The event featured a celebrity football game involving ex-internationals, like Kanu Nwankwo, Jay Jay Okocha, Peter Rufai, Joseph Yobo and Stephen Appiah.

Plot
The film starts with an Akpos (Ayo Makun) proposing to Bola (Funke Akindele) on phone through a live telecast during the annual One Lagos Fiesta. Bola accepts the marriage proposal and the newly engaged couple decides to travel overseas for pre-wedding Honeymoon. On getting to United States, they were received by Bola's sister, Abigail (Nse Ikpe Etim) and her husband, Michael Rice (Dan Davies). On arriving at Michael's home, they were in awe about the magnificent mansion they were to start living in. Bola observes that Abigael doesn't seem too happy living with her husband. Meanwhile, Michael and Akpos go to play golf. Instead of sweeping the ball, he was sweeping grass and later fell. Bola inquired about Abigail's mood, but Abigail hesitated and didn't give any reason for her mood. After Akpos and Michael came back, Bola and him fought. Later, they heard they were going to Jamaica using Michael's private jet. Akpos and Bola associate with the natives of Jamaica expressing culture shock on the way. Akpos went with some Jamaican natives to play soccer, claiming that he taught Jay Jay Okocha how to play soccer. After, he claimed that Patoranking and Cynthia Morgan can speak better Jamaican Patois than them. The men were speaking Jamaican patois but could not be understood by his friends, who hung up after a short while. After he went with the same men and was smoking Jamaican skunk, after which he ran mad. He also asked for a drink called "Sex on The Beach", which he taught was actual sex on a beach. Akpos and he bar attendant later made out. While Bola was "taking swimming lessons from a man called Marlon.  Later in the movie, Akpos, Abigail and Michael were kidnapped by Casper's (Paul Campbell) men, then Bola, and the rest call the police and Casper gets arrested with his men.It was later revealed that Michael was a drug baron, who was on the run from a mafia group in a cartel. On discovering that his location has been compromised, Michael relocates his family to Jamaica.

Cast

Reception 
Nollywood reinvented rated the movie at 31% and states that the only thing the movie has going for it is the laughs, but that too is sparse in quantity.

Okon Ekpo of YNaija panned the film from the acting to the story and the directing. He opined that the director [Peters] had not improved from his lapses in 30 Days in Atlanta. He went further to fault the storyline explaining that the screenplay was "shoddy" and "unsure of itself". He described Funke Akindele, as a genuinely funny actress, who was finding it difficult to be humorous because of the poor script. He also noted that the acting was a letdown from what was seen in 30 Days in Atlanta but praised the continuity and picture quality as an improvement from the previous film.

Isedehi Aigbogun of Film Scriptic gave it a mixed to positive review, saying: "A Trip to Jamaica is a thoroughly enjoyable and humorous movie....it's quite interesting seeing Dan Davies (Michael) as an evil person who surprisingly knows how to keep his calm. The audience feels a lot of tension when the comical couple go over the top with him...this is a strong theme. Nse Ikpe-Etim (Abigal) was exquisite in her act....although some of the other performances fell short of what was expected. Overall I genuinely enjoyed the movie".

Chidumga Izuzu of Pulse Nigeria was also critical of the film's comedic themes, describing it as a "mediocre comedy film" with limited laughing points and many unconnected jokes. She explained that Etim's interpretation of her role was flat and was lacking life. Makun was noted to have exaggerated his role as Apors. Izuzu also opined that the inclusion of Patoranking and Cynthia Morgan added no value to the film. On the plot, he described the film as proving that "a funny idea does not always make a funny movie". In comparison to 30 Days in Atlanta, Izuzu described the film as "a lesser intelligent story".

Prior to the release of the film to Nigerian cinemas, Ayo Makun reiterated that he was optimistic that the economic recession in Nigeria wouldn't affect the box office success of the film. After its release, the film was reported to have grossed higher than top Hollywood films in 2016 including Batman v Superman: Dawn of Justice, Captain America: Civil War, Suicide Squad, London Has Fallen, Gods of Egypt and Doctor Strange.

In November 2016, the film was reported to have grossed 168 million naira, breaking the previous record set by 30 Days in Atlanta. It also broke records for the first film to hit 35 million in first weekend, the first film to hit 62 million in its first week, the fastest film to gross 100 million (17 days) and the fastest film to gross 150 million (six weeks).

It opened at the Odeon Cinemas in London in December 2016 and became the highest-grossing film that weekend in London while also becoming the highest per screen average film in the UK during its limited run.

It won the Africa Entertainment Legends Award (AELA) for Best Cinema Film of 2016 and received four nominations at the 2017 Africa Magic Viewers Choice Awards, including categories for best actress in a comedy, best writer, best movie (West Africa) and best actor in a comedy. The award show was held in March 2017 in Lagos State.

References

External links 
 

2016 films
Films shot in Lagos
Films shot in Jamaica
Films set in Jamaica
Nigerian comedy-drama films
2016 comedy-drama films
2016 comedy films